Amal Mundallali is a Lebanese journalist and diplomat currently serving as the Permanent Representative of Lebanon to the United Nations and served as a Vice President in the 75th session of the United Nations General Assembly (UNGA) in 2020. Mudallali is the first Lebanese woman ambassador to the UN.

Education 
Mudallali studied Mass Communication for her first degree at the Lebanese University and obtained a master’s degree in Political Communication from Syracuse University before proceeding to the University of Maryland Where she earned a Ph.D in Political Communication.

Career 
Mudallali spent her journalism career in Washington DC working with English and Arabic broadcasters including the BBC, Radio Netherlands and Deutsche Welle. After years of journalism practice she was appointed as a foreign policy adviser to Prime Minister Rafiq Hariri serving from 2000 to 2005 and later became principal adviser on American Affairs to the Prime Minister Saad Hariri and remained in this position for several years. From 2013 to 2016, she worked as a senior scholar at the Woodrow Wilson Center in Washington, D.C. She was appointed Lebanon Permanent Representative to the United Nations in 2017 becoming the first woman to represent Lebanon at the UN. She served as a Vice President with President Tijjani Muhammad-Bande for the 75th session of UNGA in 2020.

References 

Lebanese University alumni
Syracuse University alumni
University of Maryland, Baltimore
Lebanese diplomats
Permanent Representatives of Lebanon to the United Nations
21st-century Lebanese women
Lebanese journalists